Greta Bösel (née Mueller) (9 May 1908 – 3 May 1947) was a trained nurse. Born in Wuppertal-Elberfeld, Germany, she became a camp guard at Ravensbrück in August 1944.

Her rank at the camp was Arbeitseinsatzführerin (Work Input Overseer). In November 1944, Bösel was supposed to have been one of the staff members to select prisoners for the gas chamber, or for transfer to Uckermark.  She is known to have told another SS guard "If they [prisoners] cannot work, let them rot."

After the death march of prisoners out of Ravensbrück following the impending liberation by the Red Army of Soviet troops, Bösel fled the camp with her husband. She was later caught and arrested by British troops.

Bösel, along with other female guards including Dorothea Binz, stood accused at the first Ravensbrück Trial, which took place between December 1946 and February 1947 in Hamburg, Germany. The court found her guilty of maltreatment, murder and taking part in the "selections". She was executed for her crimes at 9:55 am on 3 May 1947, 24 minutes after Elisabeth Marschall, by Albert Pierrepoint in Hamelin Prison.

References

1908 births
1947 deaths
Holocaust perpetrators in Germany
Hamburg Ravensbrück trials executions
Executed people from North Rhine-Westphalia
Executed German women
Military personnel from Wuppertal
People from the Rhine Province
Female guards in Nazi concentration camps
German women nurses
Executed mass murderers